Sgro is an Italian surname, from the medieval Greek sgouros
meaning "curly". People with the surname include:

 Chris Sgro, American political strategist.
 Giovanni Sgro, Australian politician and former Member of the Victorian Legislative Council.
 Joseph Sgro, American mathematician, neurologist / neurophysiologist, and an engineering technologist / entrepreneur.
 Judy Sgro, Canadian politician and member of the House of Commons of Canada.

References

Italian-language surnames